Todd Woodbridge and Mark Woodforde were the defending champions but lost in the semifinals to Mark Philippoussis and Patrick Rafter.

Mark Knowles and Daniel Nestor won in the final 7–6, 4–6, 7–5 against Philippoussis and Rafter.

Seeds
The top four seeded teams received byes into the second round.

Draw

Final

Top half

Bottom half

References
 1997 Newsweek Champions Cup Doubles Draw

Doubles
1997 Newsweek Champions Cup and the State Farm Evert Cup